Indira Priyadarsini Stadium is located in the coastal city of Visakhapatnam, Andhra Pradesh.

The 25,000 seat Indira Priyadarshini Stadium in this coastal town has hosted one-day cricket matches but was not yet a Test venue.

The stadium has hosted 5 ODI Matches and is also known as the Municipal Corporation Stadium. The first match was held on 9 December 1988 and the last of the 5 matches was held on 3 April 2001.

The stadium has been discontinued from hosting ODI matches in favour of the newer ACA-VDCA Stadium.

One Day International cricket

The stadium has hosted following ODI matches.

Game Statistics:
{| class="wikitable"
|-
! Category
! Information
|-
| Highest Team Score
| Australia (338/4 in 50 Overs against India)
|-
| Lowest Team Score
| New Zealand (196/9 in 50 Overs against India)
|-
| Best Batting Performance
| Mark Waugh (130 Runs against Kenya)
|-
| Best Bowling Performance
| Kris Srikkanth (5/27 against New Zealand)
|}

List of Centuries

Key
 * denotes that the batsman was not out.
 Inns. denotes the number of the innings in the match.
 Balls denotes the number of balls faced in an innings.
 NR denotes that the number of balls was not recorded.
 Parentheses next to the player's score denotes his century number at Edgbaston.
 The column title Date refers to the date the match started.
 The column title Result refers to the player's team result

One Day Internationals

List of Five Wicket Hauls

Key

One Day Internationals

Trivia
 Kris Srikkanth has the best all-round individual performance in the stadium with a match stats of 70 Runs (87b, 8x4), 7-0-27-5 and 1 Catch
 India has played in 3 of the 5 games and have won two of these games
 The Stadium was the venue of the 1996 Cricket World Cup match between Australia and Kenya

References

External links
  Cricinfo Website - Ground Page
 cricketarchive Website - Ground Page

Cricket grounds in Andhra Pradesh
Sports venues in Visakhapatnam
Sports venues completed in 1987
1987 establishments in Andhra Pradesh
1996 Cricket World Cup stadiums
20th-century architecture in India